The Democrats are a centre-left Croatian political party headed by Mirando Mrsić. The party was founded on the 20 October 2018 in Zagreb. It was officially registered with the Ministry of Public Administration on 27 November 2018.

According to the party, their program is based on a "long-term, stable, sustainable development of Croatia.

The party was part of the Amsterdam Coalition, an electoral alliance of seven Croatia liberal political parties, that participated in the 2019 European Parliament election in Croatia.

Political position
At the founding congress, Mrsić stated that the party will campaign for "a Croatia where everybody is paid for their work and of which they can live, has a dignified pension, equal access to quality health care, equal opportunity in education and to live safely in a clean and healthy environment."

The party supports:
 a competitive digital economy,
 decentralization,
 raising wages and pension,
 access to modern technologies and fast internet,
 social justice and civic liberties,
 environmental protection,
 equal opportunity in education and employment,
 LGBT rights,
 a fair judicial system,
 cutting down parafiscal taxes, etc.

Electoral history

Legislative

European Parliament

References

External links
 

2018 establishments in Croatia
Political parties established in 2018
Liberal parties in Croatia
Pro-European political parties in Croatia
Progressive parties
Social democratic parties in Croatia
Social liberal parties